Li Qiang (born 23 January 1998) is a Chinese professional footballer who currently plays as a defender for Shenzhen.

Club career
Li Qiang would be promoted to the senior team of Yanbian Funde and go on to make his debut in a Chinese FA Cup game against Shenyang Urban F.C. on 10 April 2018 that ended in a 1-1 draw, but was lost in a penalty shootout. He would gradually start to establish as a young regular within the team, however Yanbian were in financial difficulties and he was allowed to leave the club.  On 1 March 2019, Li joined newly promoted top tier club Shenzhen. He would make his debut in a league game against Chongqing Dangdai Lifan F.C. on 31 March 2019 in a 1-0 defeat.

Career statistics

References

External links

1998 births
Living people
Chinese footballers
Association football defenders
China League One players
Chinese Super League players
Yanbian Funde F.C. players
Shenzhen F.C. players